The Nobel Peace Prize is one of the five Nobel prizes established according to Alfred Nobel's 1895 will. It is awarded annually to those who have "done the most or the best work for fraternity between nations, for the abolition or reduction of standing armies and for the holding and promotion of peace congress".

Since 1901, there have been a number of peace organizations nominated for the prize. The first organization to win was the Institute of International Law, founded by Gustave Moynier and Gustave Rolin-Jaequemyns, in 1904. The institute works in making the rules of international law, abolishing causes and motives of war and violence, and developing guidelines for peaceful relations between sovereign states.

From 1901 to 1971, there have been at least 135 organizations, unions, and movements nominated for prize, 11 of which were awarded (1904, 1910, 1917, 1938, 1947, 1954, 1963, 1965, 1969, 1977, and 1995). The International Committee of the Red Cross is the most honoured organization for the prize and one of the most widely recognized organizations in the world, having won three Nobel Peace Prizes (in 1917, 1944, and 1963). The third time it won, the prize was shared with the League of Red Cross Societies.

There have been 19 years in which the Peace Prize was not awarded.

Organizations by their first nomination

1901–1909

1910–1918

1920–1929

1930–1939

1940–1949

1950–1959

1960–1969

1970–1974

See also 
 Peace movement
 List of peace activists
 List of peace prizes
 List of Nobel Peace Prize laureates
 List of female nominees for the Nobel Prize
 List of individuals nominated for the Nobel Peace Prize

Motivations

References 

+
Peace movements
Peace organizations
Nobel Peace Prize